Tinopai is a settlement on the Komiti Bay, part of the Hukatere Peninsula in the northern Kaipara Harbour in Northland, New Zealand. The Otamatea River flows from the north east past Tinopai and into the harbour.

It is now a quiet backwater. The population is approximately 400, but expands to 1000 during the summer holiday season.

The Hukatere Scenic Reserve is on the road to Matakohe and contains a bush walk with mature kauri trees, to the north of Tinopai.

History and culture

The original settlement was called Te Komiti, which was a regular stopping point for Māori travellers on the Kaipara. A large raupo church, capable of holding several hundred people, was built here in 1852. The Komiti Fruitlands Development Association bought  in 1915 to grow fruit, particularly apples, and built a wharf in 1917 from which to ship them. They renamed the area "Tinopai Fruitlands" in 1918. Apple growing finished in the mid-1930s due to the Great Depression and poor management.

There are several marae in the Tinopai area. Ngā Tai Whakarongorua Marae and its Ngā Tai Whakarongorua meeting house, and Waihaua / Arapaoa Marae and its Kirihipi meeting house are connected with Te Uri o Hau and Ngāti Whātua. Rāwhitiroa Marae and its Rāwhitiroa meeting house are a meeting place for Te Uri o Hau and the Ngāti Whātua hapū of Te Popoto. The Waiōhou and Waiotea / Tinopai marae grounds are also meeting places for both iwi.

Demographics
The SA1 area is part of the larger Ruawai-Matakohe statistical area.

The SA1 statistical area had a population of 210 at the 2018 New Zealand census, an increase of 36 people (20.7%) since the 2013 census, and an increase of 21 people (11.1%) since the 2006 census. There were 78 households, comprising 117 males and 93 females, giving a sex ratio of 1.26 males per female. The median age was 55.4 years (compared with 37.4 years nationally), with 27 people (12.9%) aged under 15 years, 27 (12.9%) aged 15 to 29, 99 (47.1%) aged 30 to 64, and 57 (27.1%) aged 65 or older.

Ethnicities were 70.0% European/Pākehā, 48.6% Māori, 2.9% Pacific peoples, and 1.4% Asian. People may identify with more than one ethnicity.

Although some people chose not to answer the census's question about religious affiliation, 47.1% had no religion, 28.6% were Christian, 7.6% had Māori religious beliefs, 1.4% were Buddhist and 1.4% had other religions.

Of those at least 15 years old, 15 (8.2%) people had a bachelor's or higher degree, and 60 (32.8%) people had no formal qualifications. The median income was $17,800, compared with $31,800 nationally. 9 people (4.9%) earned over $70,000 compared to 17.2% nationally. The employment status of those at least 15 was that 45 (24.6%) people were employed full-time, 18 (9.8%) were part-time, and 6 (3.3%) were unemployed.

Education

Tinopai School is a coeducational full primary (years 1-8) school with a roll of  students as of  The school opened on 13 September 1916.

Notes

External links
 Tinopai School website

Kaipara District
Populated places in the Northland Region
Populated places around the Kaipara Harbour